The Lucha Libre World Cup is an annual professional wrestling tournament and event organized by Mexican professional wrestling promotion Lucha Libre AAA Worldwide (AAA) since 2015. The first two tournaments, which featured three-man tag teams, referred to as trios in lucha libre, were held in Mexico City, while the third tournament, which featured traditional two-man tag teams, was held in Tokyo, Japan.

Tournaments

References